Paul Desruisseaux (May 1, 1905 – February 2, 1982) was a Canadian lawyer, businessman, and politician.

Born in Sherbrooke, Quebec, he studied law at the Université de Montréal and was called to the Quebec bar in 1934. He was the owner of La Tribune, a daily newspaper in Sherbrooke, CHLT radio station, CKTS radio station, and television station CHLT-TV.

In 1966, he was summoned to the Senate of Canada on the advice of Lester Pearson. A Liberal, he represented the senatorial division of Wellington, Quebec. He retired on his 75th birthday in 1980.

References
 
 Paul Desruisseaux fonds, Library and Archives Canada.

External links
 

1905 births
1982 deaths
Businesspeople from Sherbrooke
Canadian senators from Quebec
Liberal Party of Canada senators
Politicians from Sherbrooke
Université de Montréal alumni